Ripping Yarns is a television comedy series created by Michael Palin and Terry Jones and first broadcast on BBC 2 between 1976 and 1979. This is a list of the nine episodes forming the series. Although all were co-written by Palin and Jones, the latter appeared only in the first episode, Tomkinson's Schooldays.

Pilot and first series
The series is introduced by a bearded man in an opera cape (Palin) standing at some cliffs, who takes several tries to say the phrase "The follies of our youth are in retrospect glorious when compared to the follies of our old age." The director (Jones) keeps cueing him and finishes by saying it himself. This is a parody of Orson Welles' appearance in a Domecq sherry commercial, made explicit by Palin saying "Our sherry tonight...".

Second series
Consisting of only three episodes and following two years after the first, the series is introduced by the same presenter as the first. This time, he knows his text and explains in length about a London building, about to be important in the story. Only, a truck stops just in front of him, blocking him from view. Two cars crash in front of the truck and the truck driver does a tap dance when he realises he's on film. The presenter doesn't notice and is rather surprised when told that the scene has to be filmed again.

References

External links
Episode guide

Lists of British comedy television series episodes